The variation ratio is a simple measure of statistical dispersion in nominal distributions; it is the simplest measure of qualitative variation.

It is defined as the proportion of cases which are not in the mode category:

where fm is the frequency (number of cases) of the mode, and N is the total number of cases. While a simple measure, it is notable in that some texts and guides suggest or imply that the dispersion of nominal measurements cannot be ascertained.

Just as with the range or standard deviation, the larger the variation ratio, the more differentiated or dispersed the data are; and the smaller the variation ratio, the more concentrated and similar the data are.

An example

A group which is 55% female and 45% male has a proportion of 0.55 females (the mode is 0.55), therefore its variation ratio is

Similarly, in a group of 100 people where 60 people like beer 25 people like wine and the rest (15) prefer cocktails, the variation ratio is

See also
 Qualitative variation, for a number of other measures of dispersion in nominal variables

References
 

Statistical deviation and dispersion
Statistical ratios
Summary statistics for categorical data